The Rhinochimaeridae, commonly known as long-nosed chimaeras, are a family of cartilaginous fish. They are similar in form and habits to other chimaeras, but have an exceptionally long conical or paddle-shaped snout. The snout has numerous sensory nerve endings, and is used to find food such as small fish. The first dorsal fin includes a mildly venomous spine, used in defense.

Species 
The eight known species are in three genera:

Family Rhinochimaeridae
 Genus Harriotta Goode & Bean, 1895
 Harriotta haeckeli Karrer, 1972 (smallspine spookfish)
 Harriotta raleighana Goode & Bean, 1895 (narrownose chimaera)

 Genus Neoharriotta Bigelow & Schroeder, 1950
 Neoharriotta carri Bullis & J. S. Carpenter, 1966 (dwarf sicklefin chimaera)
 Neoharriotta pinnata Schnakenbeck, 1931 (sicklefin chimaera)
 Neoharriotta pumila Didier & Stehmann, 1996 (Arabian sicklefin chimaera)
 Genus Rhinochimaera Garman, 1901
 Rhinochimaera africana Compagno, Stehmann & Ebert, 1990 (paddlenose chimaera)
 Rhinochimaera atlantica Holt & Byrne, 1909 (broadnose chimaera)
 Rhinochimaera pacifica Mitsukuri, 1895 (Pacific spookfish)
Genus Amylodon Storms, 1895 Late Cretaceous-Paleogene

References

External links 

 

 
Cartilaginous fish families
Extant Oligocene first appearances
Taxa named by Samuel Garman